029 may refer to:
 IBM 029, a keypunch machine
 029, the telephone area code of Xi'an and Xianyang
 Cardiff, the Cardiff area code